District Institute of Education and Training, Raebareli or DIET Raebareli is a government educational institution under the nodal agency SCERT Uttar Pradesh, which provides academic and research support to elementary education in the Raebareli district. DIET serves as pre service and in service training institute for teachers in the district. Established in 1990, DIET aims to improve the Basic Education System and competence of teachers through regular training programs, projects, seminars, workshops and other academic programmes.

Objectives
Establishment of DIET's in every district of India with the financial support from the Central Government is based on the recommendation of National Policy on Education 1986. DIET serves as the third tier of training and resource support structure at the district level after NCERT at national level and SCERT's at State level.
The function of DIETs at the grassroots level in the area of elementary education can be synopsized under these three points.
Training of pre service and in service Elementary Teacher for the Basic Education System. Induction level and continuing education of non formal and adult education instructors and supervisors. Training and orientation of heads of institution in institutional planning and management and micro level planning, along with providing advice and consultancy services.
Academic and Resource Support to the elementary and adult education systems in the district by developing locally relevant materials such as teaching aids, evaluation tools. and by providing services of a resource and learning center for teachers and instructors. It also serves as evaluation centre for primary and upper primary schools as well as non formal and adult education programme. 
Action Research and Experimentation to deal with specific problems of that district in achieving the objectives in the areas of elementary and adult education and encouraging students for research and development.

Considering decentralization and the creation of a spirit of autonomy for educational institutions, DIETs are given adequate functional autonomy in academic, administrative and financial matters. As DIETs are the institutions of the State Government or UT Administration, and therefore are ultimately accountable and answerable to them. The State Government of Uttar Pradesh exercises its supervisory functions through the SCERT Uttar Pradesh and State Resource Centre on DIET Raebareli.

DIETs are non-vacation institutions and their personnel are classified as non-vacation staff, and given consequential benefits as per State Governments Rules. DIETs will provide residential facilities to as many of their trainees as may be possible within the resources available for construction hostels. In utilizing available hostel accommodation, first priority shall be given to trainees other than pre-service trainees.  The latter shall be accommodated to the extent possible after accommodation needs of all other training programmes (e.g. in-service programmes for teachers, training programmes for AE/NFE personnel. etc.) have been met.

Establishment facilities

DIET Raebareli was established in the year 1990 following the UP Government Order 1763/15(30)/90 on 1990 September. The foundation stone of its present building was laid down by then Education Minister of Uttar Pradesh Rajnath Singh on October 3, 1991.
The initial cost of construction of institution was 60 Lakhs INR. It is situated near to the National Highway NH 30 and is 81 km from Lucknow and 121 km from Allahabad. DIET Raebareli has one academic building along with two full residential hostels spread across 14 Acre of land. Its building is just opposite to Kendriya Vidyalaya Raebareli primary section building.
The intake capacity of DIET Raebareli is 200 trainees every year for its regular pre service BTC program.

Academic activities
In 2010 Digital Study Hall (DSH) began its intervention in the District Institutes for Education and Training (DIETs) of Uttar Pradesh with the aim of using innovative methods of teaching and enhancing the quality of elementary education by making the interaction between a student and a teacher more productive and effective. This intervention was launched through a program called "Capacity building of DIETs for enhancing teacher educators performance through mediation based pedagogy" in collaboration with SCERT Uttar Pradesh and UNICEF India.
DIET Raebareli was one of the 12 DIETs initially covered under this intervention and was provided with the DVDs of DSH content i.e. videos illustrating various innovative ways of teaching children and getting their full attention.
This was followed by monitoring visits in which DSH representatives came to DIET to monitor the progress and effectiveness of the program by getting firsthand information from
staff and students and filling feedback forms. 

A two-day event Classroom Culture Challenge Institute on 22–23 November 2016 was organised to demonstrate and discuss the strategies and principles to improve classroom practices and culture. 

Paryavaran Mitra is a nationwide initiative to provide youths and students from schools across the India with the necessary awareness, knowledge and motivation about the environment and sustainable development and utilising their potential and enthusiasm to meet the challenges of environmental sustainability and implement the strategies beneficial to all. DIET Raebareli is enrolled in this initiative and organises events and workshops to create awareness among the target group at regular interval.

See also 

 National Council for Teacher Education
 NCERT
 Sarva Shiksha Abhiyan

References

External links

Education in Uttar Pradesh
Universities and colleges in Raebareli